Alpinia oxyphylla, sharp-leaf galangal, is a species of ginger native to East Asia. It was first described by Friedrich Anton Wilhelm Miquel.

References

oxyphylla